Nagaram mandal is one of the 23 mandals in Suryapet district of the Indian state of Telangana. It is under the administration of Suryapet revenue division with its headquarters at Nagaram. It is bounded by Jajireddygudem mandal towards South, Thungathurthy mandal towards East, Thirumalagiri mandal towards North, Nalgonda district towards West,

Geography
It is in the 256 m elevation(altitude) .

Demographics
Nagaram mandal is having population of 27,596. Vardaman Kota is the largest village and Chennapur is the smallest village in the mandal. It is carved out from Thungathurthy mandal, Jajireddygudem mandal and Thirumalagiri mandals.

Villages
 census of India, the mandal has 10 settlements. 
The settlements in the mandal are listed below:

Notes
(†) Mandal headquarter

References

Mandals in Suryapet district